Hank and Asha is a 2013 comedy-romance directed by James E. Duff, and produced and co-written by James E. Duff and Julia Morrison. The film stars Mahira Kakkar and Andrew Pastides.  It premiered in competition at the 2013 Slamdance Film Festival where it won the Audience Award for Best Narrative Feature, and was later acquired for US distribution by FilmRise.

Plot
Asha (Mahira Kakkar), born and raised in India, is studying abroad in Prague. She longs for deeper connections with people at a time in her life when everything is about to change. Hank (Andrew Pastides), a filmmaker and lonely new transplant to New York City, is still reeling from a romantic breakup, and facing increasing pressure from his parents to return to North Carolina to rescue the failing family business.

When Asha sees Hank’s documentary at a film festival, she feels inspired to send him a video message. Intrigued, Hank responds in kind. Their friendship develops through an unconventional video correspondence, and as their relationship intensifies, they must decide whether or not to take a chance on meeting face to face.

‘Hank and Asha’ is a subjectively told cross-cultural love story that explores themes of isolation, identity, and the universal appeal of entertaining life’s what-ifs.

Cast
Mahira Kakkar ...  Asha
Andrew Pastides ... Hank
Bianca Butti ... Anne
Brian Sloan ... Bartender

Production
Husband-and-wife filmmakers James E. Duff and Julia Morrison produced the film while they were teaching at Prague Film School in the Czech Republic.  It was shot in 11 days in Prague, and 10 days in New York, and the two lead actors never met during production.

Release
The film played at 40 international film festivals including the Slamdance Film Festival, Rhode Island International Film Festival, BendFilm Festival, Heartland Film Festival, Savannah Film Festival, Indie Memphis, Thessaloniki International Film Festival, Napa Valley Film Festival, Ashland Independent Film Festival, and the RiverRun International Film Festival. It won 20 awards including 5 best narrative feature awards and 7 audience awards. The film had a limited theatrical release starting April 11, 2014, and was later released on DVD and digital platforms by FilmRise.

Awards and nominations

References

External links
 

2013 films
American romantic comedy films
2013 romantic comedy films
2010s English-language films
2010s American films